Oeste Potiguar is a mesoregion in the Brazilian state of Rio Grande do Norte.

Microregions
 Chapada do Apodi
 Médio Oeste
 Mossoró
 Pau dos Ferros
 Serra de São Miguel
 Umarizal
 Vale do Açu

Mesoregions of Rio Grande do Norte